The siege of Polotsk was a siege by forces of the Polish–Lithuanian Commonwealth under Stefan Bathory on the Russian-held city of Polotsk.   Polotsk had been captured and heavily fortified by the Russians under Ivan the Terrible in 1563 because the river Dwina, which led to the key city of Riga, flowed through it.  Hungarian soldiers, led by Caspar Bekes,  Polish soldiers, led by Mikolaj  Mielecki,  and Lithuanian soldiers, led by Mikolaj Radziwill,  converged at the Dzisna fortress, joined Bathory's men, and moved on to Polotsk, with a total force of about 42,000.  Polotsk had three fortresses: the central one, nearby Strelec fortress, and the walled town of Zapolochie. The primary focus was on the central fortress: first with artillery, which failed because it only punctured the wooden walls, then with cannons, and eventually with fire. The Russians defended Polotsk with trenches and artillery, but after the Hungarian contingent captured Zapolochie, the Russians surrendered. After taking the city, Bathory's forces then moved to besiege Velikiye Luki.>

References

Polotsk
Polotsk
Polotsk (1579)
Polotsk
1579 in Europe
16th century in Belarus
Military history of Belarus
Polotsk